Gottlieb Häusselmann was a Swiss footballer who played for FC Basel as a forward.

Häusselmann joined Basel's first team in 1921. In his first season he played only one test match.  He made his domestic league debut for the club in the away game on 30 September 1923 as Basel were defeated 2–1 by Nordstern Basel.

Between 1921 and 1924 Häusselmann played three games for Basel, two in the Swiss Serie A and one friendly game.

References

Sources
 Rotblau: Jahrbuch Saison 2017/2018. Publisher: FC Basel Marketing AG. 
 Die ersten 125 Jahre. Publisher: Josef Zindel im Friedrich Reinhardt Verlag, Basel. 
 Verein "Basler Fussballarchiv" Homepage

FC Basel players
Swiss men's footballers
Association football forwards
Year of birth missing
Year of death missing